Einsatzflottille 2 (EinsFltl 2 or EF 2) is one of the three brigade-level units of the German Navy, in addition to Einsatzflottille 1 and the Naval Air Command. It is based in Wilhelmshaven, Lower Saxony, and is subordinated to Navy Command, based in Rostock.

History
Einsatzflottille 2 was set up on June 27, 2006, as part of a major reorganization of the fleet when the previous Zerstörerflotille (Destroyer Flotilla), which was founded on April 1, 1958, as Kommando der Zerstörer (Destroyer Command), was renamed. It mostly consists of the largest units of the fleet, namely frigates and supply ships, together with some smaller support vessels.

Subordinate units

All of the frigates and some of the supply ships are stationed in Wilhelmshaven, others have their home ports on the Baltic Sea.

2nd Frigate Squadron 
The first 2. Fregattengeschwader was created on October 1, 1988, succeeding the 2nd Escort Squadron (2. Geleitgeschwader) at the same base. At first, the Bremen-class frigates F211 Köln and F212 Karlsruhe were transferred to the squadron with the 2nd batch, consisting of frigates F213 Augsburg and F214 Lübeck, following in 1989 and 1990 respectively.

The current unit was created on January 9, 2006, when the 1st (Sachsen-class frigates) and the 6th squadrons (Brandenburg-class frigates) were combined to form the new 2nd Frigate Squadron.
 Sachsen-class (124) frigates
F219 Sachsen
 F220 Hamburg 
F221 Hessen
 Brandenburg-class (123) frigates
F215 Brandenburg
 F216 Schleswig-Holstein
F217 Bayern
F218 Mecklenburg-Vorpommern

4th Frigate Squadron 
Created on 16th November 1981, the 4. Fregattengeschwader initially consisted of four Bremen-class frigates. On January 9, 2006, it was merged with the "old" 2nd Frigate Squadron to unite all eight Bremen-class frigates. They are being replaced by four Baden-Württemberg-class frigates intended for overseas peacekeeping missions and special forces support.

 Baden-Württemberg-class (125) frigates
F222 Baden-Württemberg
 F223 Nordrhein-Westfalen 
F224 Sachsen-Anhalt
 Bremen-class (122) frigates
F214 Lübeck (to be decommissioned in 2022)

Auxiliaries Squadron 
The Troßgeschwader followed the 1st and 2nd Supply Squadrons (1./2. Versorgungsgeschwader) which were transferred to the 2nd Flotilla (then: Destroyer Flotilla) in 1997 after the Supply Flotilla (Versorgungsflotille) was dissolved. The first squadron used to be stationed at Kiel Naval Base, the second in Cuxhaven, supporting navy units in the Baltic and North Seas with liquid and solid consumables. Today, eight ships remain stationed in both Kiel and Wilhelmshaven. Some are manned by navy members and others by civilian crews.

 Berlin-class (702) replenishment-ship
A1411 Berlin in Wilhelmshaven
A1412 Frankfurt am Main in Wilhelmshaven
A1413 Bonn in Wilhelmshaven
 Rhön-class (704) tanker
A1443 Rhön in Wilhelmshaven
A1442 Spessart in Kiel
Fehmarn-class (720) tug
A1458 Fehmarn in Kiel
Wangerooge-class (722) tug
A1451 Wangerooge in Wilhelmshaven
A1452 Spiekeroog in Kiel

Naval Base Command Wilhelmshaven 
The command is responsible for operations and logistics at the Heppenser Groden naval base and directly subordinate to 2nd Flotilla.

Service
The ships of Einsatzflottille 2 are often deployed on overseas assignments, usually as part of the German contribution to the standing NATO squadrons Standing NATO Maritime Group 1 (SNMG 1) and Standing NATO Maritime Group 2 (SNMG 2), and participate in NATO operations in this context. The commander of Einsatzflottille 2 often serves as the leader of national or multinational naval squadrons and is supported in this task by his staff.

Commanders

References

Military units and formations of the German Navy